Stefan "Dino" Söderholm (born 23 May 1979) is a Swedish bandy manager and former player (midfielder) who most recently managed Sandvikens AIK. Söderholm was brought up by Edsbyns IF. Söderholm has played for the Swedish national bandy team making his debut in the 2001–02 season. Söderholm has been a member of Swedish championship winning squads in the 1999–2000, 2001–02 and 2002–03 seasons for Sandvikens AIK and the 2003–04 season for Edsbyns IF  He was also a member of the Bandy World Cup winning squad in 2001–02 season.

Söderholm coached Sandvikens AIK 2012–2015.

Honours

Club 
 Sandvikens AIK
 Swedish Champions (3): 2000, 2002, 2003

 Edsbyns IF
 Swedish Champions (1): 2004

Country 
 Sweden
 Bandy World Championship: 2003, 2005

Individual 
 Swedish Junior Player of the Year (1): 1997

References

External links
Stefan Söderholm at BandySidan.nu

1979 births
Living people
Swedish bandy players
Swedish bandy managers
Edsbyns IF players
Sandvikens AIK players
Skutskärs IF players
Sandvikens AIK managers
Sweden international bandy players
Bandy World Championship-winning players